Muhamet Hamiti is a Kosovar politician, formerly an advisor to historic President of Kosovo, Dr. Ibrahim Rugova. He is ambassador of the Republic of Kosovo to London and non-resident Ambassador to New Zealand and Ireland.

Career
Hamiti was born in the Podujevo municipality of Kosovo in 1964. He earned his BA in English language and literature at the University of Pristina in 1987; earned his MA in English literature at the Zagreb University (in Croatia) in 1990, and his PhD in English literature at the University of Pristina in 2006 with a thesis on the prose fiction of James Joyce and Joseph Conrad.

In the 1990s, Hamiti was an independent scholar at the University of East Anglia and at Birkbeck College, University of London, respectively, pursuing research in and studies of literature.

Muhamet Hamiti taught English literature at the University of Pristina from 1989 until 2008. He was distinguished as a hard-working professor. He is author of a monograph book on English literature, a range of literary essays, as well as literary translations from and into English.

From 1991 through 1999 he worked at the Kosovo Information Center (KIC) – Qendra për Informim e Kosovës, QIK – as editor-in-chief for the English service. He edited and translated into English a number of publications that KIC undertook during those years of the Kosovar's struggle for freedom and independence.

Muhamet Hamiti is a member of the Democratic League of Kosovo (LDK) since 1990, and a member of LDK's executive body since 2002.

Muhamet Hamiti was a media advisor and spokesman to the President of Kosovo, Ibrahim Rugova, from mid-2002 through January 2006, when he died of cancer.

In February 2006, Muhamet Hamiti was appointed a senior political advisor to Rugova's successor to the Presidency of Kosovo, Fatmir Sejdiu.

References

Living people
Academics of the University of East Anglia
Academics of Birkbeck, University of London
Kosovan diplomats
Ambassadors of Kosovo to Ireland
Ambassadors of Kosovo to New Zealand
Ambassadors of Kosovo to the United Kingdom
Year of birth missing (living people)